This is a list of the guest cast of characters in the 2015 Filipino primetime television series FPJ's Ang Probinsyano under ABS-CBN Entertainment.

List of guest stars were played the minor cast

 Julio Diaz as Julian Valerio
 Tess Antonio as Train Passenger (Mother)
 Raikko Mateo as Train Passenger (Son)
 Gloria Sevilla as Purificación Moreno
 Cris Villanueva as P/Insp. Rev. Fr. Torre
 Lance Lucido as young Ryan Guzman
 Lisa Marie Marcos as young Rachel Tuazon
 Jervi Cajarop as President Enrico Escudero (fictional version of President Benigno Aquino III)
 Tony Mabesa as Priest at Ador and Carmen's wedding and Ador's burial
 Jao Mapa as PO1 Salas
 Ramon Christopher as SPO1 Ramos
 Baron Geisler as David S. Madarang and Dante "Bungo" S. Madarang
 Allyson McBride as Nicole Santos
 Izzy Canillo as young Ador de Leon and Cardo de Leon
 Alfonso Yñigo Delen as Buboy
 Felix Roco as Mall Crook
 Giovanni Baldisseri as P/Supt. Lemuel Peralta
 Zeppi Borromeo as SPO2 Roberto "Bong" de Vera and Derick 
 Sandino Martin as SPO2 Marlon Delgado
 Liza Diño as Hostaged Reporter
 Epi Quizon as Rebel Commander
 Zaijan Jaranilla as Cocoy Amaba
 Gio Alvarez as Arabas Amaba
 Mymy Davao as Elena "Lena" Amaba
 Crispin Pineda as Community Leader
 Nadine Samonte as Rose Dalisay
 Marco Alcaraz as PC/Insp. Dr. Ramon Dalisay, MD
 Sharlene San Pedro as teenage Glen Corpuz
 Nash Aguas as teenage Ador de Leon and Cardo Dalisay
 Jett Pangan as Edson Lee
 Iza Calzado as Col. Olivia Buenaventura
 Richard Quan as SPO4 Nestor Defra
 Richard Yap as Philip Tang
 David Chua as Kevin
 Carla Humphries as Teacher Ofelia
 Miguel Gabriel Diokno as Iñigo dela Paz
 Rufa Mi as Iñigo's nanny
 Jong Cuenco as Governor Edward dela Paz
 Jade Ecleo as Mrs. dela Paz
 Tutti Caringal as Dencio
 Lloyd Zaragoza as Dencio's partner
 Neil Coleta as MMDA Constable Miguel Clemente
 Eli Almiranes as MMDA Constable Andres "Andoy" Torre Jr.
 Val Iglesias as Bus Hijacker and Turo
 Yayo Aguila as Marita de Vela
 Kathleen Hermosa as Teresa "Tere" de Vela
 Jay Manalo as Victor Mangubat
 Ronaldo Valdez as Leonardo Demetrio/Conrado "Ninong" Villegas
 Rex Lapid as Gusting
 Maricar Reyes as Isabel
 Joem Bascon as Raymond
 Polo Ravales as Brad
 Hannah Ledesma as Jenna
 Miguel Faustmann as Kenneth Burton
 Sunshine Garcia as Noemi Dominguez
 Gina Pareño as Maria Olga "Madam Olga" Fernandez
 Susan Africa as Lorena
 Myrtle Sarrosa as Doreen Villaluna
 Justin Cuyugan as Apolinario "Apple" Mauricio
 Dawn Chang as Elaine Gomez
 Jason Francisco as Arnold Cortes
 Rein Gutierrez as Rosario
 Shey Bustamante as Cristina Jane "Tina" Laxamana
 Boy Roque as Yacht Helmsman
 Anne Curtis as Katrina "Trina" N. Trinidad
 Christopher de Leon as Michael "Mike" Alonso
 Ogie Diaz as Fritz
 Nonie Buencamino as Roberto Homer "Scarface" Dimayuga
 Alexa Macanan as teenage Trina N. Trinidad
 Cheska Iñigo as Rosella Noble-Alonzo
 Mico Palanca as Jake
 Jan Marini as PO3 Maricel Marquez
 Boom Labrusca as Waldo
 William Lorenzo as Berting
 Ana Capri as Ligaya (Berting's wife)
 Gerard Pizarras as SPO1 Marquez
 Pen Medina as Fernan
 Eric Quizon as Dr. Ivan Gomez
 Josh Ivan Morales as Tony
 Gelli de Belen as Belinda Ojeda
 Angelou Alayon as Jordan Ojeda, Jr.
 Niña Dolino as Iris
 Eric Fructuoso as Benjamin Joseph "Banjo" Moreno
 Alex Medina as Allen
 Jordan Herrera as Charlie Malibay 
 Jef-Henson Dee as Olan
 Michael Rivero  as Macario "Sir Bok" Samonte
 Tonton Gutierrez as SPO4 Pablo B. de Leon
 Ritz Azul as Erica Nobleza
 Yogo Singh as Jepoy
 Inah Estrada as Cristina Nobleza 
 Jess Lapid, Jr. as PS/Insp. Raul Toribio
 Jake Cuenca as Jonas Paulino
 Elmo Magalona as Andrew Abella
 Janella Salvador as Denise Paulino
 Jane Oineza as young Flora Borja
 Toby Alejar as Mr. Paulino
 Maila Gumila as Mrs. Paulino
 Franco Daza as Kirk and Santiago
 Emmanuelle Vera as April Hizon
  Kyra Custodio as Lisa
 Melissa Mendez as Mrs. Abella
 Ian de Leon as PS/Supt. Bartolome “Bart” Catindig
 Smokey Manaloto as Gordon Layug
 Victor Neri as Mayor Anton Guerrero
 Mon Confiado as Cheng Lao
 Bonel Balingit as Totoy Layug
 Lilia Cuntapay as Loring Layug
 Angelica Panganiban as Marta S. Maglipon/Jade Blanco
 Nikki Valdez as Analynne Canlaon
 Veyda Inoval as young Analynne
 Avery Balasbas as young Marta
 Suzette Ranillo as Dely (Analynne's mother)
 Lui Villaruz as Domeng Canlaon
 Renzel Palaje as Chabita
 Tina Paner as Teresa “Teri” Porres
 Yesha Camile as Angela Canlaon
 Juan Rodrigo as Romeo "Romy" Maglipon
 Wendell Ramos as Nelson Wong
 Cesar Montano as PS/Insp. Hector Mercurio
 Meg Imperial as Maribel "Marie" Alegre
 Bembol Roco as PC/Supt. Redentor Almario
 Bernadette Allyson-Estrada as Irene Mercurio
 Erin Ocampo as Ella
 Eddie Gutierrez as P/DGen. (Chief PNP) Rodolfo D. Recto
 Geraldine Villamil as Dahlia
 Archie Adamos as Leroy
 Manuel Chua as Zaldy
 Kiko Matos as Enteng
 Emilio Garcia as Atong
 Vice Ganda as Emmanuel "Ella" Moreno/Magdalena/Sharmaine
 Chokoleit as Jonel
 Pooh as Wanda
 Thou Reyes as Bogart
 Jeffrey Santos as Ella's neighbor
 Jordan Castillo as Ella's neighbor
 Bret Jackson as Matthew "Matt" Bale
 Candy Pangilinan as Aida Bale
 Lee O'Brien as Roland Bale
 Josh de Guzman as young Wanda/Juan
 JB Agustin as young Ella/Emmanuel
 Lance Macalinao as young Jonel
 John Regala as Congressman Randolf Subito
 Rubi Ruiz as Choleng
 Maria Isabel Lopez as Clarissa Subito
 Albie Casiño as Richmond Subito
 Cherry Pie Picache as Linda Aguilar
 Carlo Aquino as Marlon Aguilar
 Allan Paule as Melencio Aguilar
 Ronnie Quizon as Romulo
 Chanel Morales as Richmond's female drug consumer
 Raph Robes as Richmond's friend
 Ethan Salvador as Governor's son and Richmond's fellow drug dealer
 James Blanco as Edwin H. Maniego
 Paulo Avelino as Eric "Erwin" H. Maniego
 Jan Michael Patricio Andres as young Eric
 Jahren Dave Estorque as young Edwin
 Grae Fernandez as teenage Eric
 Jairus Aquino as teenage Edwin
 Jenny Miller as Eric and Edwin's stepmother
 Jef Gaitan as Lara
 Earl Ignacio as SOCO Police Officer Dante
 Jojo Riguerra as Mr. Recio
 Efren Reyes Jr. as Apollo Magat
 Jayson Gainza as Jimmyboy "Jimboy" Escaño 
 Jose Sarasola as Apollo's henchman
 Joseph Ison as Apollo's henchman
 Mike Agassi as Froilan Asuncion
 Bradley Holmes as Franco
 Valerie Concepcion as Nurse Andrea
 Sophia Reola as young Alyana R. Arevalo
 Rez Cortez as PC/Supt. Rogelio Jacob
 Ricardo Cepeda as PC/Insp. Albertino Tejada
 Gerald Madrid as SPO2 Regalado
 Janus del Prado as Allan dela Paz/Jonel
 Paolo Serrano as SPO2 Soliman
 Miguel Enrile as Makmak's school bully
 Bing Davao as Roderick Wang
 TJ Trinidad as Atty. Patrick (Tomas' Lawyer)
 Cassey Mae Real as Trixie
 DJ Durano as Wang's right-hand man
 Antoinette Taus as Maggie Padua
 Johnny Revilla as Prosecutor
 Jun Urbano as Damian
 Nonong "Bangky" de Andres as Gorio
 Michelle Vito as Janice Vergel
 Tom Olivar as J/Dir. Raul Olarte
 Bearwin Meily as JO2 Timbang (Olarte's Jailguard)
 Dan Alvaro as Olarte's Jailguard
 Rommel Montano as Brando
 Archie Alemania as Choy
 Dido dela Paz as Inmate
 Christian Vasquez as Benedicto Vergel/Atty. Fernando Mante
 Carlo Maceda as Douglas
 Desiree del Valle as Monica Montenegro
 Menggie Cobarrubbias as Cardo's defense lawyer
 Minco Fabregas as Prosecutor
 Lou Veloso as Miyong
 Spanky Manikan as Estong
 Carlos Morales as Anton
 Jeric Raval as Gener Guinto
 Alessandra de Rossi as Rowena Macaraeg
 Christopher Roxas as Marcelo
 Elia Ilano as Gigi (Onyok's sister)
 Dindo Arroyo as J/Dir. Guillermo Acosta
 Joseph Bitangcol as JO3 Cristobal Mendoza (Acosta's Jailguard)
 Mae Paner as Doray
 Pontri Bernardo as Danilo
 Alchris Galura as JO2 Roque (Acosta's Jailguard)
 Banjo Romero as Park Robber and Mr. Valdez's henchman
 Sue Prado as Lita Escaño
 Ronnie Lazaro as Romano "Chairman" Recio
 Deborah Sun as Maria (Julian's ex-wife)
 Paul Sy as Paeng
 Jojit Lorenzo as Amado Ignacio
 Aleck Bovick as Cora Ignacio
 Kristoffer King as Alwyn Recio
 Ranulfo Docdocan as Rannie
 Jelson Bay as Donato
 William Martinez as Jomar
 Jake Roxas as Daniel
 Jason Abalos as Alexis
 Maris Racal as Rona Carreon
 Sam Pinto as Isabel
 Sonny Parsons as Fidel
 Melizza Jimenez as Sally
 Ahron Villena as Drug Fish Syndicate Dealer
 Ketchup Eusebio as Drug Fish Syndicate Dealer
 Atoy Co as Drug Fish Syndicate Leader
 Daniel Fernando as Jack Chan
 Simon Ibarra as young adult Emilio Syquia and Enrique Vera
 Rochelle Barrameda as Teresa Syquia
 Anne Feo as Atty. Peralta (Don Emilio's lawyer)
 Mike Lloren as J/Dir. Benito Manlapig
 Harold Baldonado as Bolit
 Brando Legaspi as Jonard
 Bimbo Bautista as Atty. Andrew Mariano (Cardo's lawyer)
 Rolando Inocencio as Prosecutor Jason Herrera
 Jethro Ramirez as JO1 Perez (Ladronio's Jailguard)
 King Gutierrez as J/Dir. Pedro Ladronio
 Lito Legaspi as Jonathan Wu
 Joey Padilla as Joey Boy Tiocson (Wu's right-hand man)
 Nhikzy Calma as Atong
 Christian Morones as Albert Jacob
 Alma Concepcion as Bettina Jacob
 Biboy Ramirez as Drug Dealer
 Eslove Briones as CIDG's Accomplice
 Daryl Ong as Singer at Cardo and Alyana's Wedding
 KZ Tandingan as Singer at Cardo and Alyana's wedding
 Gary Valenciano as Singer at Cardo and Alyana's wedding
 Mark Lapid as Antonio "Tigre" del Mundo
 Ronwaldo Martin as Roldan/Gagamba
 Jun Hidalgo as Luis "Buwaya" Mangubat
 Gene Padilla as Pilo/Tuko
 Wilmar Peñaflorida as Mando/Ahas
 Edwin Nombre Pamanian as Hunyango
 Dino Pastrano as Col. Ernesto Capili
 Marco Gumabao as Jose Rafael "Joel" T. Olegario
 Mercedes Cabral as Aurora Dumaguit
 Yam Concepcion as Magdalena "Lena" Dumaguit
 Emmanuel Matteo Gabriel Plan as Emman
 Vickie Rushton as Amanda
 Tanner Mata as Clark
 Ron Morales as SPO2 Bernardo "Bernie" Quinto
 Dominic Roque as SPO3 Christian "Chris" Clemente
 Louise delos Reyes as SPO3 Katrina "Kat" Velasco
 Ejay Falcon as SPO2 Geraldo "Gerry" dela Paz
 Hero Angeles as SPO3 Mark Capellan 
 Michelle Madrigal as SPO2 Sunshine Montenegro
 AJ Muhlach as Simon "Paniki" Yumul
 Dante Rivero as Domingo "Lawin" Bulaon
 Lito Pimentel as young Domingo Bulaon
 Jon Lucas as young Renato Hipolito
 Jomari Angeles as young Romulo Dumaguit
 Rey Solo as Kalabaw
 Benzon Dalina as Barakuda
 Paul Alvarez as Sebastian
 Aljur Abrenica as Miguel Enriquez
 Jestoni Alarcon as Javier Enriquez
 Lem Pelayo as SAF Officer Simpao
 Joko Diaz as Senator Mateo F. de Silva
 Alvin Anson as Alvaro
 Gerald Ejército as Ronald
 Roberto "Amay Bisaya" Reyes as Ruben
 Vince Rillon as Victor de Silva
 Angeline Quinto as Regine “Jean” Moreno
 Janno Gibbs as Bruno Moreno
 Rico J. Puno as Engelbert "Daga" Moreno
 Irma Adlawan as Dulce (Engelbert's wife)
 Ernie Garcia as Abdon
 Minnie Aguilar as Rebecca "Becky" Balaraw
 Anghel Marcial as Happy
 Joel Saracho as Dolfo
 Pocholo Barretto as PC/MSgt. Demetrio Pantig
 Raph Fernandez as PE/MSgt. Juanito Gapuz
 Lowell Conales as Drug Dealer
 Via Antonio as Sheila Dueñas
 Bernard Palanca as Mayor Jethro "Jet" Garrido
 Lance Raymundo as Lester Magno
 Matet de Leon as Menchu Versoza
 Teroy de Guzman as Pedro Salao
 JV Kapunan as Danny B. Nobleza (Student Drug Dealer)
 Sarah Carlos as Michelle G. Abad (Nobleza's accomplice)
 Jimboy Martin as Redentor D. Padua (Nobleza's accomplice) and P/Cpt. Jerry Abalos
 Patrick Sugui as Blake C. de Palma (Nobleza's accomplice)
 Mara Alberto as Halina
 Nicco Manalo as Stephen "Peng" Balaraw
 Jessy Mendiola Andrea "Andi" B. Collins, RN/Violet
 MC Muah as Lala
 Gwen Garci as Hasmin Garcia
 Jaycee Parker as Marigold Parker
 Zara Lopez as Dalia Lopez
 Maui Taylor as Rose Taylor
 Katya Santos as Blossom Santos
 Andy Kunz as Mr. Gibson
 Viveika Ravanes as Kapitana Dindi
 Arnold Cortez as Mayor Rolando Magpantag
 Ali Khatibi as Joaquin Campos
 Rey "PJ" Abellana as Brother Lorenzo Alano
 Mayen Estanero as Teacher Cecil
 Arvic Tan as Xavier
 Carlo Mendoza as Tutoy Mendoza
 Ces Aldaba as Marsing
 Eva Vivar as Nita
 Isabela "Lala" Vinzon as Lorie
 Mel Feliciano as Mario
 Joross Gamboa as Tanggol
 Jess Evardone as Primo
 Juan Miguel Severo as Fredo
 Mhot as Simon
 Roderick Paulate as Mayor Adonis Dimaguiba
 Carmi Martin as Margarita "Margie" Corona
 Alora Sasam as Charlene Corona
 Amy Nobleza as Denise
 Rommel Padilla as Baldo
 Alvin Fortuna as PC/Supt. Perez
 Agnes Pabalan as Beth Espinosa
 Ced Torrecarion as Nico Espinosa
 Robert Arevalo as Efren Espinosa
 Marissa Delgado as Melba Espinosa
 Sue Ramirez as Marie Espinosa
 Marlo Mortel as Noel Marasigan
 Nikko Natividad as Bong
 Soliman Cruz as P/DGen. (Chief PNP) Alejandro Terante
 Mystica as Rosa
 Kid Lopez as Adonis
 Franco Laurel as Vice President Albert Hernandez
 Gian Magdangal as Executive Secretary Damien Ocampo
 Ryan Eigenmann as Daniel Gascon H. Dela Vega
 Sarah Jane Abad as Snooki
 Mark "Big Mac" Andaya as Bruno
 Darwin "Hap Rice" Tolentino as Tyson
 Gio Marcelo as Akiro
 Ivana Alawi as Madonna
 Alex Diaz as Jordan de Jesus
 Ariel Villasanta as Gapon
 Levi Ignacio as Diego
 Margaret Don as News Reporter
 Junjun Quintana as PS/Insp. Bueno
 Lance Serrano as PS/Insp. Cruz
 Roger Calvin as Domeng
 Micah Muñoz as Mr. Valdez
 Rey Malonzo as P/MGen. Manuel G. Dela Cruz
 Eric Perez as Judge Rogelio Salvacion
 Cogie Domingo as P/Cpt. Eric Opeña
 Jess Mendoza as P/Cpt. Henry Eugenio
 Mike Magat as P/Gen. (Chief PNP) Ernesto Peralta
 Ivan Carapiet as Cedrick
 Gardo Versoza as Lazaro "Uwak" Enriquez/Rodolfo Salazar
 Phoebe Walker as PS/MSgt. Catherine Parana 
 Stacey Gabriel as P/MSgt.  Tricia Almario
 Louise Gertrude as P/Lt. Isabel Tiongson
 Ana Jalandoni as P/Lt. Gelyn Gomez
 Jachin Manere as PS/MSgt. Celeste Miranda
 Agimat Maguigad as Gambler
 Leo Martinez as Kapitan Bartolome "Bart" C. Bulaan
 Gerard Acao as Timo
 Denise Laurel as P/Maj.  Alessandra "Alex" T. Romero
 Nico Gomez as P/Cpt. Benjamin Santos
 Nilo Frias as PS/MSgt. Roger Cueto
 Zandro Salgado as P/Lt. Christopher Hernandez
 Jasmine Mendoza as Madeleine Lee
 Empoy Marquez as Domingo "Domengsu" Suarez
 Mel Martinez as Mamu
 Nadia Montenegro as Nida
 Alynna Asistio as Vanessa
 Caloy Alde as Buloy
 Dexie Diaz as Dexie
 Sammie Rimando as Raquel
 John Manalo as Pitoy
 Zeus Collins as Fredo
 Victor Silayan<ref
name=SapangBato/> as Joselito "Bolit" Laxamana
 Ronald Asinas as Bolit's Goon
 Denise Joaquin as Michelle Rivera
 Arron Villaflor as P/Cpt. Amir Marquez
 Mart Escudero as P/Lt. Karlo Ramos
 Josef Elizalde as PLt. Louie Rallos
 Kaiser Boado as P/MSgt. Eric Gabriel
 Nick Apolinar as P/Lt. John Gary Tuaño
 KC Montero as Lance Mendez
 Kean Cipriano as Migz
 Jennifer Lee as Chloe M. Delgado
 Jon Achaval as P/MGen. Felipe Romero
 Pinky Marquez as Rosario T. Romero
 Cecille Escolano as Amelyn
 Jasper Visaya as Gaspar
 Judy Ann Santos-Agoncillo as Jane Sebastian/Maureen de los Santos
 Yasmyne Suarez as young Jane
 Franki Russell as P/MSgt. Hannah Robles
 Diana Mackey as P/Lt. Samantha Salazar
 Jessica Marasigan as PS/MSgt. Lea Singson
 Romnick Sarmenta as Juan/Lemuel Pineda
 Jhay Bruce "Piniski" Garcia as Elias
 Janice Hung as Meilin Yang
 Angela Clare Tan as young Meilin Yang
 Carlos Siguion-Reyna as Prof. Ernesto Tordesillas
 Kim Molina as Kagawad Bea Malonzo (spoof of Bea Alonzo)
 Priscilla Almeda as Krista Sandoval
 Paul Montecillo as Luis "Whiskey" Quijano
 Robert Seña as Stanley Galvez
 Jerald Napoles as Jimbo Padua
 Rhen Escaño as Clarice Padua
 Kara Mitzki as P/Lt. Serene Mendoza
 Ana Abad Santos as Ombudsman Castillo
 Dennis Raymundo as P/Cpt. Lawrence Raymundo
 Froilan Sales as Eduardo "Nico" Villamor
 Jose "Kaka" Balagtas as Bank Manager Eliza Dominguez's father and Donato
 Barbie Imperial as P/Lt. Camille Villaluna
 Isabelle de Leon as P/Lt. Marielle Lazcano
 Richard Manabat as Alejandro Galvez
 John Joseph Tuason as Mr. Chen
 James Llanes as Vice President Carlos Javellana
 Eric Nicolas as Ramon
 Marissa Sanchez as Maring
 Maynard Lapid as Salvador
 Richard Gutierrez as Executive Secretary Angelito "Lito" Valmoria
 Mark Leviste as Antonio
 Robbie Packing as Mr. Castelo
 Julian Roxas as Julian
 Jeolanie Sacdalan as Berto
 Seth Fedelin as Macoy
 Kevin de Vela as Vito
 Edwin Pandagani as Mr. Reyes
 Jupeter Villanueva as Mr. Calavera
 Albert Langitan as Mr. Gonzales
 Marlon Mance as Dr. Nuevas
 Benjie Paraan as Ruben
 Angelo Valmoria Roxas as Bong Barrera
 James D.C Olipas as Eljin Ramirez
 Jonar del Rosario as P/Cpt. Bunye
 Johnmark Taraje as Tyron
 Vance Larena as PE/MSgt. Ivan Ponce 
 Jane De Leon as P/Cpt. Natalia "Lia" Mante
 Mark McMahon as P/Cpt. Cris Fabia
 Paolo Paraiso as P/Cpt. David Alcantara
 AJ Raval as P/Cpt. Andrea Villar
 Edward Albe Pandagani as Col. Ed Sarmiento
 Marlon Liwanag as Antonio Liwanag
 Bubbles Paraiso as Lara Vera
 Drey Brown as Malena
 Jamina Cruz as Margarita
 Mitoy Yonting as Teban
 Giselle Sanchez as Pilar
 John Rollie Gabayno as Harold
 Soldier (Coco Martin's pet dog) as Soldier (Col. Pelaez's pet dog)
 Esmeraldo Valencerida as Col. Francisco Pelaez
 Peter Georgo as Mr. Wood
 Dini Ouattara as Dini (Mr. Wood's bodyguard)
 Chris Perris as Mr. Hanson
 Michael Millz as Michael (Mr. Hanson's bodyguard)
 Cristina Gonzales as Dr. Amalia Mante, MD
 Paulo Angeles as P/Lt. Jim De Castro
 Enzo Pineda as P/Cpt. Alvin Cuevas
 Aya Fernandez as Dr. Audrey Mante, MD
 Elaine Ochoa as P/Cpt. Victoria "Vicky" Cruz
 Danny Ramos as Winston Cabral
 Julia Montes as Mara Silang/Maria Isabel G. Hidalgo/Jennifer Salve
 Joseph Marco as Lucas Catapang
 John Estrada as Armando Silang
 Rosanna Roces as Lolita Silang
 Chase Romero as P/Lt. Castro
 MJ Reyes as P/Lt. Ramos
 Tommy Abuel as Don Ignacio Guillermo
 Vangie Labalan as Lucia Bueñas
 Marela Torre as Thalia Gonzales
 Chai Fonacier as Cheche
 Elora Españo as Aira
 Michael Flores as Samuel Catapang
 Christian Singson as Armando's henchman
 Rani Caldoza as Remy
 Rogerson Jimenez Pulido as Atty. Fred Santillan
 Nixon Mañalac as RJ
 John Wayne Sace as Omar Cuevas
 Ruben "Kidlat" Pedrosa as Sebastian
 Paul Ryan Aquino as Paeng
 Tanie Capiral as Ditas
 Roi Vinzon as Eduardo Guillermo
 Sharon Cuneta as First Lady Aurora Guillermo-Hidalgo
 George de Lumen as Mr. Babas
 Jared Gillett as William Calloway 
 Resa Toledo as Ressa
 Alianna Duran as Delia
 Imee Casañas as Aimee Cruz
 Noel Colet as Senate President Camilo Edades
 Lally Buendia as Malacañang reporter
 Charo Santos-Concio as Ramona
 Jerome Ponce as P/Cpt. Adrian Jimenez
 Richard Arellano as Alfonso
 Erlinda Villalobos as Consuelo
 Michael Brian as Berto
 Raymond Bagatsing as Lucio Santanar
 Karl Medina as Kidlat
 Diego Romero as Nante 
 Roni Petterson as Gen. Alvarez

Notes

See also
 List of Ang Probinsyano episodes
 List of Ang Probinsyano characters

References

External links

Lists of actors by drama television series
Lists of guest appearances in television